Norma Caldwell Russell (born August 23, 1937) was an American politician in the state of South Carolina. She served in the South Carolina House of Representatives as a member of the Republican Party from 1972 to 1980, representing Lexington County, South Carolina. She was a freelance court reporter.

References

1937 births
Living people
People from Lexington County, South Carolina
Women state legislators in South Carolina
Republican Party members of the South Carolina House of Representatives
20th-century American politicians
20th-century American women politicians
21st-century American women